Ardee Community School, also known as St Killian's or ACS, is a community school located in Ardee, County Louth, Ireland. It is a co-educational school where pupils of all religious denominations study together. As is the case with all community schools, a board of management, answerable to the school's trustees and to the Minister for Education, manages the school. The board is composed of two teacher representatives, two parent representatives, six nominees from the trustees and the principal, who is secretary to the board of management.

As of 7 October 2015, the school has approximately 738 students enrolled in its classes.

An extension to the school was completed in 2017 delivering a 2-storey extension along with a new car park.

Overview
ACS has a wide array of subjects for students to choose from. Leaving Cert students may study: Accounting, Art, Biology, Business, Chemistry, Construction Studies, Economics, English, Engineering, French, Geography, German, Home Economics, History, Health Education, Irish, Mathematics, Music, Physical Education, Religious Education and Technical Drawing.

The school is staffed with Special Needs Assistants (SNAs) who provide assistance to students with additional needs.

History
Ardee Community School was established in 1974 and was the first community school outside the Greater Dublin area. It aims to fulfil the secondary educational needs of Ardee and its surrounding areas. The school was founded as an amalgamation of three schools which had previously existed independently: St Anne’s Convent of Mercy, De La Salle Brothers’ School and the Vocational School. Many of the teachers who worked in one of the three schools continued their work in Ardee Community School.

Sport 
ACS encourages students to participate in Gaelic football, soccer, rugby, golf, basketball and athletics.

Selected sporting highlights from 2012-14 included:

Lennon Cup 
In 2012, the Senior Gaelic football team, under the guidance of Mark Gilsenan, a Maths teacher in ACS, won the Lennon cup for the first time, defeating St. Mary's of Drogheda on a scoreline of 4-11 to 0-7. The following year, Ardee made it back to the Lennon cup victorious once again, defeating The Marist of Dundalk in a replay. The school was not as success in the following years however, it wasn't until 2017 that Ardee CS claimed the Lennon Cup after three attempts, edging out St Josephs Secondary School on a scoreline of 0-13 to 1-09.

All-Ireland 'C' Championship 
In 2014, the Senior Gaelic team at the time reached the All Ireland 'C' final, this team included Louth player Ryan Burns, though they were defeated by Coláiste Ghobnatan of Cork on a scoreline of 1-12 to 2-6. Four years later, after two new senior team squads, the Senior Gaelic team achieved success at a national level by beating St Declan's Community College from Waterford in Newbridge on Easter Saturday in 2018, they were crowned All-Ireland Schools 'C' Championship winners, beating St. Declan's CS from Waterford 1-9 to 0-3 at Newbridge.

Notable alumni 

 Dr Peter Geraghty - former President, Royal Town Planning Institute.
Mairead McGuinness - First Vice-President of the European Parliament.
 Ross Gaynor - former Republic of Ireland Under 21 footballer.
 Sarah Bardon - political adviser for Minister for Further and Higher Education, Research, Innovation and Science, Simon Harris and former The Irish Times political reporter. 
Daniel McDonnell - Irish Independent soccer correspondent.
Nicola Bardon - Journalist
Barry Landy - Journalist and author of Emerald Exiles 
Dr Stephen Fedigann - biopharmaceutical scientist, Leo Pharma.

References

Secondary schools in County Louth
Educational institutions established in 1974
Community schools in the Republic of Ireland
1974 establishments in Ireland
Ardee